Martin Hongla Yma II (born 16 March 1998) is a Cameroonian professional footballer who plays as a central defender or a defensive midfielder for Spanish club Real Valladolid, on loan from Italian club Hellas Verona, and the Cameroon national team.

Club career
Born in Yaoundé, Hongla joined Granada CF in 2016, from Blaise Nkufo's Nkufo Sports Academy. He was initially assigned to the reserves in Segunda División B.

Hongla made his senior debut on 21 August 2016, starting in a 1–1 home draw against Atlético Mancha Real. He made his first team – and La Liga – debut on 28 January 2017, playing the full 90 minutes in a 2–0 defeat at Villarreal CF.

Ahead of the 2017–18 season, Hongla was definitely promoted to the main squad, now in Segunda División. On 16 January 2018, he was loaned to fellow league team FC Barcelona B, for six months.

On 3 July 2019, after a six-month loan to FC Karpaty Lviv, Hongla joined Royal Antwerp FC in the Belgian First Division A. On 9 July 2021, he joined Italian Serie A club Hellas Verona on loan with a conditional purchase obligation.

On 31 January 2023, Hongla returned to Spain and its top tier, after agreeing to a six-month loan deal with Real Valladolid.

International career
Hongla played at the 2015 African U-17 Championship, 2017 Africa U-20 Cup of Nations qualification and the 2019 Africa U-23 Cup of Nations.

He made his debut for Cameroon national team on 16 November 2020 in a Cup of Nations qualifier game against Mozambique, as a starter.

Career statistics

Honours
Antwerp
 Belgian Cup: 2019–20

References

External links

1998 births
Living people
Footballers from Yaoundé
Cameroonian footballers
Association football defenders
Association football midfielders
Association football utility players
Cameroon international footballers
Cameroon youth international footballers
Cameroon under-20 international footballers
2021 Africa Cup of Nations players
2022 FIFA World Cup players
La Liga players
Segunda División players
Segunda División B players
Belgian Pro League players
Serie A players
Club Recreativo Granada players
Granada CF footballers
FC Barcelona Atlètic players
Ukrainian Premier League players
FC Karpaty Lviv players
Royal Antwerp F.C. players
Hellas Verona F.C. players
Real Valladolid players
Cameroonian expatriate footballers
Cameroonian expatriate sportspeople in Spain
Expatriate footballers in Spain
Cameroonian expatriate sportspeople in Ukraine
Expatriate footballers in Ukraine
Cameroonian expatriate sportspeople in Belgium
Expatriate footballers in Belgium
Cameroonian expatriate sportspeople in Italy
Expatriate footballers in Italy